Prampram is a coastal town in the Greater Accra Region of Ghana. The town is located in the Ningo Prampram District.

Prampram (Gbugbla), the capital of Ningo-Prampram, is 15 minutes' drive from the port city of Tema and 45 minutes from Accra, the national capital, and is an emerging center of industrial activities.

Places of interest
The town is set to become an international hub as the government has acquired more than 60 acres of land to construct the country's first Aerotropolis.

Prampram has some of the cleanest white sand beaches in the country, dotted with several pleasure spots for tourists and holidaymakers.

The town is home to the first and only bulletproof police station in Ghana, built by the Danes.

A small English trading fort, Fort Vernon, built in 1742, is located in Prampram.

A video showing the Dancing Pallbearers, carrying a coffin and dancing to remember the deceased person's life, soon became viral, and later an internet meme.

In February 2021, Romco Group opened a non-ferrous recycling facility in Prampram, consisting of two furnaces.

Notable natives 
Notable natives and residents of Prampram include:
 Nene Annorkwei II
 Kofi Adumua Bossman, former Justice of the Supreme Court of Ghana
 W. A. N Adumua Bossman, former President of Ghana Bar Association
 Enoch Teye Mensah (E. T. Mensah), former member of the Ghana Parliament for Ningo-Prampram
 Naa Morkor Busia , former first Lady , wife of late Dr. Kofi Abrefia Busia
 Ernestina Naadu Mills, former Ghana first lady, wife of the late President John Atta Mills
 Members of the Nana Otafrija Pallbearing Service, also known as The Dancing Pallbearers
Charles Akonnor, Ghanaian football coach, Head Coach of the Ghana national football team

Notable schools 

 Prampram Senior High School
 Prampram Women's Vocational Training Institute
 Central University 
 Oasis International Training Centre

References

Populated places in the Greater Accra Region